Regina Lewis is an American author, national television contributor, and businesswoman. She was a contributor to USA Today and regularly covered economic headlines for MSNBC. 

She first appeared on national TV news in 1999 on the CBS Early Show and was a DIY Network host and co-host on CNNfn and CNN Headline News. She also commentated for Today, The View, and Fox News Channel.

Ms. Lewis was a producer, writer and reporter for the Emmy-nominated “My Generation” on PBS and is the author of the best-selling book Wired in a Week'  

She contributed to the primetime series Big Brother and  Extra'' where she hosted red-carpet interviews for major events including the Grammys and the world premiere of Harry Potter.

Over the course of a decade, she was a spokesperson for  AOL, Amazon, Bank of America, and Microsoft.

She currently serves as Vice President of Communications for the International Division of Marriott International which spans 136 countries and territories.

Personal life 
Lewis is married to John Cowne and lives in Northern Virginia. They have six children.

References

External links 
 https://www.usatoday.com/story/money/personalfinance/2013/06/01/quick-tips-videos-best-of-regina-lewis/2378193/
 MSNBC
 

Living people
American television personalities
American women television personalities
Year of birth missing (living people)